Bilal Rafiq (born 19 October 1985) is a Pakistani footballer, who plays for PIA FC. He is also a member of Pakistan national football team.

Rafiq plays as a goalkeeper. He earned his first international cap during the SAFF Cup.

References

Living people
Pakistani footballers
Pakistan international footballers
1985 births
Association football goalkeepers